Charles Jonathan Driver, usually known as Jonty Driver, (born 1939) is a South African anti-apartheid activist, former political prisoner, educationalist, poet and writer.

Childhood 
"Jonty" Driver was born in Cape Town in 1939, but spent the years of the Second World War in Kroonstad and Cradock with his mother and younger brother and grandfather who was the rector of the Anglican parish there. During this period his father did wartime service in North Africa.  Driver's father was captured by the Axis forces at Tobruk and spent the rest of the war as a prisoner of war in Italy and Germany. When he came back to South Africa, the family moved to Grahamstown in the Eastern Cape, where his father was appointed chaplain at St. Andrew's College and where Jonty later did his schooling.

Student days 
Driver did his undergraduate study at the University of Cape Town (UCT). He was elected president of the National Union of South African Students in 1963 and again in 1964. In August and September 1964, he was detained without trial by the police and held in solitary confinement, possibly because of his suspected involvement in the African Resistance Movement, on his release he immediately left for England. He went to Trinity College, Oxford, to read for an M.Phil.

While he was at Oxford, the South African authorities refused to renew his passport and he became stateless for several years, eventually becoming a British citizen. For more than twenty years he was prohibited from returning to South Africa.

Work in education 
After his time at Oxford, Driver taught at Sevenoaks School in Kent and then at Matthew Humberstone Comprehensive School in Lincolnshire (formerly Humberside) after 1973, where he was Director of Sixth-Form Studies. He wrote Patrick Duncan: South African and Pan-African while on a sabbatical from the school in 1976 and before taking up his next appointment.

In 1976 he was a Research Fellow at the University of York, and for twenty-three years he was a headmaster (Principal, Island School, Hong Kong, 1978–83; Headmaster, Berkhamsted School, 1983-9; Master, Wellington College, 1989–2000).

Writing career 
 Driver was a full-time writer, though he continues his involvement in education.

He is  an honorary senior lecturer at the School of Literature and Creative Writing, University of East Anglia, a post he has held since 2007.

He was a judge for the Caine Prize for African Writing, 2007 and 2008. He was a fellow of the Bogliasco Foundation in 2007. He was a fellow at the MacDowell Colony in New Hampshire, USA, in the fall of 2009, and a fellow at the Hawthornden Writers' Retreat in March/April 2011.

Personal life
He is married with three children and eight grandchildren.

Selected works 

  with Adrian Leftwich
 

 
 
 
 
 

 
 (About the five schools at which Driver worked)
 (A collection of 22 poems)

References

Citations

Sources

Further reading

External links 

1939 births
Living people
Alumni of St. Andrew's College, Grahamstown
Alumni of Trinity College, Oxford
Anglican anti-apartheid activists
English-language South African poets
South African writers
University of Cape Town alumni
White South African anti-apartheid activists